The 2014 All Japan Indoor Tennis Championships was a professional tennis tournament played on carpet. It was the 18th edition of the tournament which was part of the 2014 ATP Challenger Tour. It took place in Kyoto, Japan between 3 and 9 March.

ATP singles main-draw entrants

Seeds

 1 Rankings are as of February 24, 2014.

Other entrants
The following players received wildcards into the singles main draw:
  Hiroyasu Ehara
  Takuto Niki
  Takashi Saito
  Kento Takeuchi

The following players received entry from the qualifying draw:
  Peng Hsien-yin
  Arata Onozawa
  Wang Chieh-fu
  Yuuya Kibi

The following players received entry as a lucky loser into the singles main draw:
  Toshihide Matsui

Champions

Singles

 Martin Fischer def.  Tatsuma Ito, 3–6, 7–5, 6–4

Doubles

  Purav Raja /  Divij Sharan def.  Sanchai Ratiwatana /  Michael Venus, 5–7, 7–6(7–3), [10–4]

External links
Official Website

All Japan Indoor Tennis Championships
All Japan Indoor Tennis Championships
All Indoor Tennis Championships
All Indoor Tennis Championships